The lovely cotinga (Cotinga amabilis) is a species of bird in the family Cotingidae. It is found in North and Central America from southern Mexico through Guatemala, Belize, Honduras and Nicaragua to Costa Rica with reports from western Panama. Its natural habitats are tropical moist lowland forests and heavily degraded former forest. The male is a bright turquoise blue while the female is greyish-brown with pale underparts. Because of its total population size and wide range, this species is not yet considered vulnerable.

Description

It has a small, rounded head, a plump body and short tail. The male is a brilliant turquoise blue and closely resembles the blue cotinga (Cotinga nattererii). It lacks the black eye-ring of that species, and has a more purple bib and a much larger patch of purple on the breast. The flight feathers are black with broad blue edges. The upper tail-coverts are blue, and are so long that it is difficult to see the black tail feathers. The female also resembles the blue cotinga female; its upper parts are greyish-brown with white scalloping, and its pale underparts are mottled and spotted with grey rather than having the scaly appearance of the female blue cotinga. This species is usually silent, but does sometimes emit fluttering rattles when on the wing.

Distribution and habitat
This species is found in Mexico, Guatemala, Honduras, Nicaragua, Costa Rica, Panama and Belize. It is a denizen of humid forests and woodland edges, feeding on fruit high in the canopy. Early in the morning, it is often to be seen perched above the canopy on a protruding branch.

Status
Cotinga amabilis has a very wide range but is a somewhat uncommon species. Partners in Flight has estimated that the total population is in the range of 20,000 to 49,999 mature individuals. Despite the fact that the population trend appears to be downwards, the International Union for Conservation of Nature has rated the bird as being of "least concern" because it is not believed to be declining sufficiently rapidly to warrant placing it in a more threatened category.

References

Further reading

External links

Photo

lovely cotinga
Birds of Central America
Birds of Mexico
Least concern biota of North America
lovely cotinga
Taxonomy articles created by Polbot